Ashleigh Barty and Jennifer Brady defeated Desirae Krawczyk and Bethanie Mattek-Sands in the final, 6–4, 5–7, [10–5], to win the doubles tennis title at the 2021 Stuttgart Open. By winning her 12th career WTA Tour doubles title, Barty became the first player since Lindsay Davenport in 2001 to sweep both tournaments in Stuttgart. This was also Brady's first career WTA Tour doubles title.

Mona Barthel and Anna-Lena Friedsam were the defending champions from when the tournament was last held in 2019, but lost in the quarterfinals to Nadiia Kichenok and Raluca Olaru.

Seeds

Draw

Draw

References

External Links
 Main Draw

Porsche Tennis Grand Prixandnbsp;- Doubles
2021 Doubles